The list of ship launches in 1668 includes a chronological list of some ships launched in 1668.


References

1668
Ship launches